This is a list of notable Pacific hurricanes, subdivided by reason for notability. Notability means that it has met some criterion or achieved some statistic, or is part of a top ten for some superlative. It includes lists and rankings of Pacific hurricanes by different characteristics and impacts.

Characteristics include extremes of location, such as the northernmost or most equator-ward formation or position of a tropical cyclone. Other characteristics include its central pressure, windspeed, category on the Saffir–Simpson scale, cyclogenesis outside of a normal hurricane season's timeframe, or storms that remain unnamed despite forming after tropical cyclone naming began in 1960. Another characteristic is how long a system lasted from formation to dissipation. These include the cost of damage, the number of casualties, as well as meteorological statistics such as rainfall point maximum, wind speed, and minimum pressure.

Impact

Retired names

Adolph and Israel were removed from the list of names during and after the 2001 season due to political sensitivities. Knut was removed from the list in 1988 for unknown reasons. Adele, Iva, and Fefa were also removed in 1970, 1988, and 1991 respectively for unknown reasons. Hazel was replaced in 1965. The name Isis was also pre-emptively removed from the lists of names for 2016 after being deemed inappropriate because of the eponymous militant group in 2015.

Unnamed but historically significant

Deadliest tropical cyclones

Costliest tropical cyclones

The following tropical cyclones have caused at least $500 million in damage.

Seasonal activity and records
In the Central Pacific Hurricane Center's (CPHC) area of responsibility (AOR), the season with the most tropical cyclones is the 2015 season with 16 cyclones forming in or entering the region. A season without cyclones has happened a few times since 1966, most recently in 1979.

Highest

Lowest

Before 1971 and especially 1966, data in this basin is extremely unreliable. The geostationary satellite era began in 1966, and that year is often considered the first year of reliable tropical records. Intensity estimates are most reliable starting in the 1971 season. A few years later, the Dvorak technique came into use. Those two factors make intensity estimates more reliable starting in that year. For these reasons, seasons prior to 1971 are not included.

Earliest storm formation by number

Naming history

Naming of tropical cyclones in the eastern north Pacific began in the 1960 season. That year, four lists of names were created. The plan was to proceed in a manner similar to that of the western Pacific; that is, the name of the first storm in one season would be the next unused one from the same list, and when the bottom of one list was reached the next list was started. This scheme was abandoned in 1965 and next year, the lists started being recycled on a four-year rotation, starting with the A name each year. That same general scheme remains in use today, although the names and lists are different. On average, the eastern north Pacific sees about sixteen named storms per year.

Named storms per month

Before 1971 and especially 1966, data in this basin is extremely unreliable. The geostationary satellite era began in 1966, and that year is often considered the first year of reliable tropical records. Intensity estimates are more reliable starting in the 1971 season. A few years later, the Dvorak technique came into use. Those two make intensity estimates more reliable starting in that year. For these reasons, seasons before 1966 are not included in the lowest column.

† Shared by more than five seasons.
Source:

Off-season storms

The Pacific hurricane season runs from May 15 to November 30. Only systems that develop or enter during the off-season are included. The earliest off-season storm is Pali in 2016 whilst the latest off-season storm was Nine-C during 2015.

†Entered the basin on this date

Unnamed storms

Tropical cyclones have received official names in the east-central Pacific region since 1960. Since this time, 6 systems that have formed in this area have not received a name, plus another possible unnamed subtropical or tropical system in 2006.
 Tropical Storm 4 (1962)
 Tropical Storm 8 (1962)
 Tropical Storm Four (1963)
 Hurricane 12 (1975)
 Tropical Storm One-E (1996)
 Tropical Storm Seven-E (2020)

Strength

Category 5

Since 1959, only 18 Pacific hurricanes are known to have reached Category 5 and none made landfall while at this intensity.

Category 4

Since 1900, 129 Pacific hurricanes have attained Category 4 intensity, of which four made landfall at that strength.

Category 3

Since 1970, 82 Pacific hurricanes have attained Category 3 intensity, of which three made landfall at that strength.

Duration records

This lists all Pacific hurricanes that existed as tropical cyclones while in the Pacific Ocean east of the dateline for more than two weeks continuously. Hurricanes John and Dora spent some time in the west Pacific before dissipating. John spent eleven days west of the dateline; if that time was included John would have existed for a total of 30 days and 18 hours, while including Dora's time in the west Pacific would mean that it existed for 18 days. One Atlantic hurricane, Hurricane Joan, crossed into this basin and was renamed Miriam, giving it a total lifespan of 22 days, but not all of that was in the Pacific. 1993's Greg formed from the remnants of Tropical Storm Bret (1993). Its time as an Atlantic system is excluded.

All of these systems except Trudy, Olaf, and Connie existed in both the east and central Pacific, and all except Olaf were hurricanes. Hurricane Trudy of 1990 is thus the longest lived eastern Pacific hurricane to stay in the eastern Pacific. Tropical Storm Olaf of 1997 is hence the longest-lived eastern Pacific tropical cyclone not to reach hurricane intensity.

No known tropical cyclone forming in the central north Pacific lasted for longer than 14 days without crossing into another basin. The tropical cyclone forming in the central Pacific that spent the most time there was Hurricane Ana (2014) at 12.75 days from formation to extratropical transition.

Before the weather satellite era began, the lifespans of many Pacific hurricanes may be underestimated.

Crossover storms

From Atlantic to Eastern Pacific

This includes only systems which stayed a tropical cyclone during the passage or that maintained a circulation during the crossover.

It used to be that when a Pacific named storm crossed North America and made it to the Atlantic (or vice versa), it would receive the next name on the respective basin's list. However, in 2000 this policy was changed so that a tropical cyclone will keep its name if it remains a tropical cyclone during the entire passage. Only if it dissipates and then re-forms does it get renamed.

From Eastern Pacific to Atlantic

This includes only systems which stayed a tropical cyclone during the passage or that maintained a circulation during the crossover.

From Eastern Pacific to Western Pacific

Neither eastern Pacific tropical cyclones passing 140°W, nor central Pacific tropical cyclones crossing the dateline, are notable events. However, very few eastern Pacific proper cyclones that enter the central Pacific make it to the dateline.

 System ceased to be a tropical cyclone and regenerated at least once during its life span.

‡ System formed in the eastern Pacific, but was not named until it crossed into the central Pacific.

In addition, Hurricane Jimena of 2003 is recognized per NHC, CPHC and JTWC as a storm that existed in all three areas of responsibility, but isn't recognized by the JMA as an official western Pacific tropical cyclone.

From Western Pacific to Central Pacific

Tropical cyclones crossing from the western Pacific to the central Pacific are fairly rare, and this has happened only ten times. Of those ten times, six of them were storms which crossed the dateline twice; from the western to the central pacific and back (or vice versa). No tropical cyclone from the western Pacific has ever traveled east of 140°W.

 System crossed the dateline twice.

* Hurricane/Typhoon John formed in the eastern Pacific.

From Central Pacific to Eastern Pacific

Tropical cyclones crossing from the eastern Pacific to the central Pacific are routine; ones going the other way are not. That event has happened four times.

 System crossed 140°W more than once.

In addition to these, an unofficial cyclone formed on October 30, 2006 in the central Pacific subtropics. It eventually developed an eye-like structure. Its track data indicates that it crossed from the central to the east Pacific because it formed at longitude 149°W and dissipated at 135°W. NASA, which is not a meteorological organization, called this system a subtropical cyclone, and the Naval Research Laboratory Monterey had enough interest in it to call it 91C. The system has also been called extratropical. This cyclone is unofficial because it is not included in the seasonal reports of either Regional Specialized Meteorological Center.

Intensity records

Ten most intense

Per lowest central pressure

The apparent increase in recent seasons is spurious; it is due to better estimation and measurement, not an increase in intense storms. That is, until 1988, Pacific hurricanes generally did not have their central pressures measured or estimated from satellite imagery.

* Estimated from satellite imagery

 Measured and adjusted

 Measured

~ Pressure while East of the International Date Line

Per highest sustained winds

Strongest storm in each month
Intensity is measured solely by central pressure unless the pressure is not known, in which case intensity is measured by maximum sustained winds.

 This tropical cyclone is the strongest to form in its month by virtue of its being the only known system.

Strongest landfalling storms

Unusual landfall locations

California 

 After October or before June, 1854 – A system considered a tropical cyclone makes landfall just north of the Golden Gate.
 October 2, 1858 – A hurricane makes a direct hit on Southern California before dissipating. The hurricane may or may not have made landfall in San Diego County, due to uncertainty in the track reconstruction. San Diego experienced hurricane-force winds, with torrential rainfall recorded all across Southern California. 
 After October or before June, 1859 – A system considered a tropical cyclone makes landfall between Cape Mendocino and San Francisco Bay.
 September 25, 1939 – The 1939 California tropical storm makes landfall in San Pedro, California, killing 45 to 93 people.
 September 6, 1972 – Tropical Depression Hyacinth makes landfall.
 September 6, 1978 – Tropical Depression Norman makes landfall.

Hawaii 

 August 9, 1871 - Indigenous sources suggest that a Category 3 hurricane struck the Big Island and Maui.
 August 7, 1958 – A tropical storm makes landfall on the Big Island of Hawaii.
 August 7, 1959 – Hurricane Dot makes landfall on Kauai.
 October 20, 1983 – Tropical Depression Raymond makes landfall on Molokai, Oahu, and Kauai.
 August 3, 1988 – Tropical Depression Gilma makes landfall on Maui and Molokai.
 September 11, 1992 – Hurricane Iniki makes landfall on Kauai, killing six throughout the islands.
 September 14, 1992 – Tropical Depression Orlene makes landfall on the Big Island.
 July 24, 1993 – Tropical Depression Eugene makes landfall on the Big Island of Hawaii.
 August 8, 2014 – Tropical Storm Iselle makes landfall on the Big Island of Hawaii, killing one on Kauai.
 July 24, 2016 – Tropical Storm Darby makes landfall on the Big Island of Hawaii.
 September 12, 2018 – Tropical Storm Olivia makes landfall on Maui and Lanai.

Wettest tropical cyclones

All of these values are point maxima.

Mexico

Hawaii

Continental United States

Overall

Worldwide cyclone records set by Pacific storms
 Fastest intensification (1-minute sustained surface winds): Hurricane Patricia 55 m/s (120 mph, 105 kt, 195 km/h), from 40 m/s (85 mph, 75 kt, 140 km/h) to 95 m/s (205 mph, 180 kt, 335 km/h) in under 24 h

 Farthest-travelling tropical cyclone: Hurricane John travelled for 13,180 km.
 Highest Accumulated cyclone energy (ACE) index for a tropical cyclone: Hurricane/Typhoon Ioke achieved an ACE index of 82.
 Tropical cyclone at Category 4 or 5 intensity on the Saffir–Simpson scale for the longest: Hurricane Ioke was at that intensity for 198 consecutive hours.

See also

 List of Atlantic hurricane records
 Pacific hurricane season
 List of tropical cyclones

Notes

References